Tectonatica tecta, common name the mottled necklace shell, is a species of predatory sea snail, a marine gastropod mollusk in the family Naticidae, the moon snails.

Description

Distribution
This marine species occurs in the Atlantic Ocean off Namibia; off the south and west coast of South Africa; in the Indian Ocean off Mozambique and Madagascar.

References

Naticidae
Gastropods described in 1838